The 1946 All-Ireland Senior Hurling Championship Final was the 59th All-Ireland Final and the culmination of the 1946 All-Ireland Senior Hurling Championship, an inter-county hurling tournament for the top teams in Ireland. The match was held at Croke Park, Dublin, on 1 September 1946, between Kilkenny and Cork. The Leinster champions lost to their Munster opponents on a score line of 7–5 to 3–8.

Match details

All-Ireland Senior Hurling Championship Final
All-Ireland Senior Hurling Championship Final, 1946
All-Ireland Senior Hurling Championship Final
All-Ireland Senior Hurling Championship Finals
Cork county hurling team matches
Kilkenny GAA matches